On June 30, 2016, at least 40 people were killed and 50 people were wounded after two Taliban suicide bombers attacked police cadets returning from a graduation ceremony west of the capital city, Kabul. The attacks followed the Kabul attack on Canadian Embassy Guards and occurred during the Kunduz-Takhar highway hostage crisis. The attacks all occurred during the holy month of Ramadan.

Events 
Outside the capital, two suicide bombers approached a police convoy carrying police cadets who had recently graduated at a ceremony on the city's western outskirts. After the first bomber attacked the bus, rescuers began to arrive. The second assailant then drove a suicide car bomb into the area where the first incident occurred, which was surrounded by emergency vehicles. Two people who were not police cadets then died, said Governor Musa Khan. The bombers specifically targeted Afghan policemen during the attack, another in a string of attacks on government workers.

President Ashraf Ghani called the bombings a "crime against humanity". He was angry about the killing of innocent citizens of his nation, especially during a holy month which many of them celebrate.

See also
List of Islamist terrorist attacks
List of terrorist incidents, January–June 2016
Kabul attack on Canadian Embassy Guards
Kunduz-Takhar highway hostage crisis
July 2016 Kabul bombing

References 

2016 murders in Afghanistan
Mass murder in 2016
Taliban attacks
Terrorist incidents in Afghanistan in 2016
War in Afghanistan (2001–2021)
June 2016 crimes in Asia
June 2016 events in Afghanistan
History of Maidan Wardak Province